Ace Frehley is the first solo studio album by American guitarist Ace Frehley (formerly of Kiss). It was released by Casablanca Records on September 18, 1978. It was one of four albums released by all Kiss members as solo albums.

Background
The album was produced by Frehley and Eddie Kramer. It featured Anton Fig on drums. He later performed session work on the Kiss albums Dynasty and Unmasked, and became a member of Ace Frehley's band Frehley's Comet. Fig and Will Lee, who played bass on three of the album's tracks, later gained prominence as members of the World's Most Dangerous Band and the CBS Orchestra along with Paul Shaffer on Late Night with David Letterman and Late Show with David Letterman. In an interview with Loudwire, Frehley stated that some of the songs from his solo album were originally slated for the fifth Kiss album, Rock and Roll Over.

Critical reception

In a retrospective review Greg Prato of AllMusic wrote that "of the four Kiss solo albums, the best of the bunch is Ace Frehley's", who "did not stray far from the expected heavy Kiss sound". Jason Josephes of Pitchfork concurred that it was the standout of the Kiss solo efforts, describing it as "a melange of riff rock, power pop, and just a little bit of soul". Canadian journalist Martin Popoff defined Ace Frehley as "the least pretentious, heaviest and best-selling platter of the Kiss' solo album quartet", describing the music as "solid, well-rounded simplified '70s metal".

Commercial performance
"New York Groove", which was first recorded in 1975 by British glam rock band Hello, rose to No. 13 on the US Billboard Hot 100 singles chart. This was the highest chart placement for any of the singles released from the 1978 solo albums. The album reached No. 26 on the US Billboard 200 album chart. It was certified platinum on October 2, 1978, and shipped over 1,000,000 copies. It is the highest selling of the four Kiss solo albums in the Sound Scan era (1991 onwards).

Track listing
All credits adapted from the original release.

Personnel
Artist
Ace Frehley – lead vocals, backing vocals, lead, rhythm and acoustic guitar, guitar synthesizer, bass

Additional personal
Anton Fig – drums, percussion
Will Lee – bass on "Ozone", "I'm in Need of Love" and "Wiped-Out"
Carl Tallarico – drums on "Fractured Mirror"
David Lasley and Susan Collins – backing vocals on "Speedin' Back to My Baby", "What's on Your Mind?" and "New York Groove"
Larry Kelly – backing vocals on "Rip It Out"
Bill "Bear" Scheniman – bell on "Fractured Mirror"
Bobby McAdams – power mouth (talkbox) on "New York Groove"

Production
Eddie Kramer and Ace Frehley – producers
Eddie Kramer and Rob Freeman – engineers
Eric Block and Don Hunerburg – assistant engineers
George Marino – mastered at Sterling Sound, NYC
Dennis Woloch – album design
Eraldo Carugati – album artwork

Charts

Album

Singles

Certification

References

External links
 
 KISSONLINE.COM Discography- Ace Frehley, Accessed on July 28, 2008

1978 debut albums
Ace Frehley albums
Albums produced by Eddie Kramer
Casablanca Records albums